Arne Reidar Mikkelsen (born July 23, 1944) is a Norwegian ice hockey player. He played for the Norwegian national ice hockey team, and  participated at the Winter Olympics in 1968 and in 1972. He was awarded Gullpucken as best Norwegian ice hockey player in 1973.

References

1944 births
Living people
Ice hockey players at the 1968 Winter Olympics
Ice hockey players at the 1972 Winter Olympics
Norwegian ice hockey players
Olympic ice hockey players of Norway
Ice hockey people from Oslo